The Copper River or Ahtna River, Ahtna Athabascan ‘Atna’tuu, "river of the Ahtnas", Tlingit Eeḵhéeni, "river of copper", is a 290-mile (470 km) river in south-central Alaska in the United States. It drains a large region of the Wrangell Mountains and Chugach Mountains into the Gulf of Alaska. It is known for its extensive delta ecosystem, as well as for its prolific runs of wild salmon, which are among the most highly prized stocks in the world. The river is the tenth largest in the United States, as ranked by average discharge volume at its mouth.

Description
The Copper River rises out of the Copper Glacier, which lies on the northeast side of Mount Wrangell, in the Wrangell Mountains, within Wrangell-Saint Elias National Park. It begins by flowing almost due north in a valley that lies on the east side of Mount Sanford, and then turns west, forming the northwest edge of the Wrangell Mountains and separating them from the Mentasta Mountains to the northeast. It continues to turn southeast, through a wide marshy plain to Chitina, where it is joined from the southeast by the Chitina River (Ahtna Athabascan Tsedi Na'  < tsedi "copper" + na’ "river").

Downstream from its confluence with the Chitina it flows southwest, passing through a narrow glacier-lined gap in the Chugach Mountains within the Chugach National Forest east of Cordova Peak. Both Miles Glacier and Childs Glacier calve directly into the river.

History

The name of the river comes from the abundant copper deposits along the upper river that were used by Alaska Native population and then later by settlers from the Russian Empire and the United States. Extraction of the copper resources was problematic due to navigation difficulties at the river's mouth. The construction of the Copper River and Northwestern Railway from Cordova through the upper river valley from 1908 to 1911 allowed widespread extraction of the mineral resources, in particular from the Kennecott Mine, discovered in 1898. The mine was abandoned in 1938 and is now a ghost town tourist attraction and historic district maintained by the National Park Service.

Copper River Highway (Alaska Route 10) runs from Cordova to the lower Copper River near Childs Glacier, following the old railroad route and ending at the reconstructed Million Dollar Bridge across the river. The Tok Cut-Off (Alaska Route 1) follows the Copper River Valley on the north side of the Chugach Mountains.

Fisheries

The river's famous salmon runs arise from the use of the river watershed by over 2 million salmon each year for spawning. The extensive runs result in many unique varieties, prized for their fat content. The river's commercial salmon season is very brief, beginning in May for chinook salmon and sockeye salmon for periods lasting days or hours at a time. Sport fishing by contrast is open all year long, but peak season on the Copper River lasts from August to September when the coho salmon runs. The fisheries are co-managed by the Alaska Department of Fish and Game (ADF&G) and the Department of the Interior Federal Subsistence Board.  Management data are obtained primarily by ADF&G at the Miles Lake sonar station and the native village of Eyak at the Baird Canyon and Canyon Creek research stations.

Birding

The Copper River Delta, which extends for 700,000 acres (2,800 km2), is  the largest contiguous wetlands along the Pacific coast of North America. It is used annually by 16 million shorebirds, including the world's entire population of western sandpipers and dunlins. It is also home to the world's largest population of nesting trumpeter swans and is the only known nesting site for the dusky Canada goose subspecies (Branta canadensis occidentalis).

See also

List of rivers of Alaska

References

Further reading
Brabets, Timothy P. (1997). Geomorphology of the Lower Copper River, Alaska [U.S. Geological Survey Professional Paper 1581]. Washington, D.C.: U.S. Department of the Interior, U.S. Geological Survey.

External links

Ecotrust Copper River Program
Copper River salmon habitat management study Prepared for Ecotrust by Marie E. Lowe of the Institute of Social and Economic Research, hosted by Alaska State Publications Program
Alaska Department of Fish and Game: Copper River Salmon
Eyak Preservation Council
Nature Conservancy: Copper River Delta
The Copper River Watershed Project
NVE Fisheries Research and Seasonal Employment on the Copper River
Cordova District Fishermen United
Wrangell-St. Elias National Park information
Copper River | Chitina Dipnet Fishery Escapement Charts

Ahtna
Rivers of Alaska
Rivers of Chugach Census Area, Alaska
Rivers of Copper River Census Area, Alaska
Rivers of Unorganized Borough, Alaska